Rodríguez Saá is the surname of a powerful family of the San Luis Province in Argentina, whose members include:

Adolfo Rodríguez Saá (elder), governor of the province (1909–12)
Adolfo Rodríguez Saá, former senator and governor of the province and president of Argentina for a few days (often erroneously mistaken for an interim president).
Alberto Rodríguez Saá, former senator and current governor of the province.
Nicolás Rodríguez Saá, national deputy (2019–21).
Ricardo Rodríguez Saá, governor of the province (1934–38).

See also
 Saa (disambiguation)
 Rodriguez (disambiguation)